"So So Good" is a song by Swedish pop boyband FO&O. The song was released as a digital download in Sweden on 5 May 2017 through Artist House Stockholm. The song did not enter the Swedish Singles Chart, but peaked to number 18 on the Sweden Heatseeker Songs.

Music video
A music video to accompany the release of "So So Good" was first released onto YouTube on 5 May 2017 at a total length of two minutes and fourteen seconds.

Charts

Weekly charts

Release history

References

2017 singles
2017 songs
FO&O songs
English-language Swedish songs